A Dead Sinking Story is an album by the Japanese band Envy. The album was released on August 18, 2003 on Level Plane Records. It is their only album recorded with three guitarists; Daichi Takasugi joined before the creation of the album and left after the related tour.

Track listing

Personnel
Dairoku Seki – Drums
Tetsuya Fukagawa – Sequencer, Vocals
Nobukata Kawai – Guitar
Masahiro Tobita – Guitar
Manabu Nakagawa – Bass Guitar
Daichi Takasugi – Guitar
Takashi Kitaguchi – Engineering
Tatsuya Kase – Mastering

Reception

Reception was almost uniformly positive, with Allmusic, Stylus Magazine, and Punknews.org all praising the album's hybrid of emo, screamo, and post-rock.

References

2003 albums
Level Plane Records albums
Envy (band) albums